An ocean gyre is any large system of rotating ocean currents in oceanography.

Gyre or gire may also refer to:

Natural and scientific phenomena
 Cyclone 
 Tornado 
 Tropical cyclone
 Vortex
 Whirlpool or maelstrom

Other uses
 Gire, a band including the musician Kátai Tamás
 TeX Gyre, a collection of fonts derived from fonts released by URW++ Design & Development GmbH
 USNS Gyre (T-AGOR-21), a research ship

See also 
 The Widening Gyre (disambiguation)
 Jabberwocky